is a 1992 historical drama film directed by Rou Tomono, based on his novel of the same name. It stars Masaya Kato, Diane Lane, Yuen Biao, and Donald Sutherland.

The film was a Taiwanese-Chinese-Japanese co-production.

Cast
 Keishi Arashi - Isihara Kanji
 Shinsuke Ashida - President of Mantetsu
 Tomoko Hoshino - Miyama Mieko
 Masaya Kato - Kaya Tatsuma
 Tamio Kawaji
 Arthur Kuroda - Kouhei
 Diane Lane - Cho Renko
 Haruo Mizuno - Yamashita
 Hideo Murota - Yamami Gou
 Baijaku Nakamura - Mamiya Seijirou
 Umenosuke Nakamura - Ryu Souji
 Akemi Negishi - Yamashita's wife
 Akira Nishikino - Domon
 Jiro Okazaki - Tanaka
 Shōgo Shimada
 Jo Shishido
 Donald Sutherland - John Williams
 Takahiro Tamura - Yamashiro
 Danshi Tatekawa - Aozora-dokoya
 Biao Yuen - Tougetsu

External links

1992 films
1990s historical drama films
Taiwanese historical drama films
Chinese historical drama films
Japanese historical drama films
1990s Japanese-language films
English-language Chinese films
English-language Japanese films
English-language Taiwanese films
Films based on Japanese novels
1992 drama films
Triad films
1990s Japanese films
1990s Hong Kong films